The Ato Institucional Número Cinco – AI-5 was the fifth of seventeen major decrees issued by the military dictatorship in the years following the 1964 coup d'état in Brazil.  Institutional Acts were the highest form of legislation during the military regime, given that they overruled even the highly authoritarian Constitution, and were enforced without the possibility of judicial review. They were issued on behalf of the "Supreme Command of the Revolution" (the regime's leadership). By suspending habeas corpus, the AI-5 enabled worst of the human rights abuses of the military dictatorship.

AI-5, the most infamous of all Institutional Acts and sometimes called  ('the coup within the coup'), was issued by dictator Artur da Costa e Silva, president at the time on December 13, 1968. It resulted in the forfeiture of mandates, interventions ordered by the President in municipalities and states and also in the suspension of any constitutional guarantees which eventually resulted in the institutionalization of the torture commonly used as a tool by the State. 

Written by then Minister of Justice, Luís Antônio da Gama e Silva, it came as a response to earlier events such as a march of over fifty thousand people in Rio de Janeiro to protest against the murder of student Edson Luís de Lima Souto by a member of the Military Police of Rio de Janeiro, the March of the One Hundred Thousand, and the decision of the Chamber of Deputies denying authorization to prosecute Congressman Márcio Moreira Alves, which called Brazilians to boycott the celebrations of September 7 (Independence of Brazil). It also aimed to consolidate the ambitions of a group inside the military, known as "hardline", unwilling to give the power back to the civilians anytime soon.

Consequences
The immediate consequences of the AI-5 were:

 The President of the Republic was given authority to order the National Congress and the State Legislative Assemblies into forced recess.  This Unclassified document shows how AI-5 forced Municipal Councils to recess.  This document, which was declassified, discusses how a powerful military General thought that the Congress being closed was a "blessing." Costa e Silva used this power almost as soon as AI-5 was signed, resulting in the closure of the National Congress and all state legislatures except that of São Paulo for almost a year. The power to order the National Congress into recess would be used again in 1977.
 The assumption by the President of the Republic and the Governors of the States, during the periods of forced recess of the federal and state Legislatures, respectively, of the fullness of the legislative power, enabling the President and the Governors to legislate by decrees with the same force and effect as statutes passed by the legislative Chambers. This power included the power to legislate constitutional amendments. A sweeping amendment of Brazil's 1967 Constitution (already adopted under the Military Regime) was promulgated in 1969 (Constitutional Amendment number 1, also known as the 1969 Constitution, because the entire altered and consolidated text of the Constitution was re-published as part of the Amendment), under the authority transferred to the Executive Branch by the AI-5.
 the permission for the federal government, under the pretext of "national security", to intervene in states and municipalities, suspending the local authorities and appointing federal interventors to run the states and the municipalities;
 the preliminary censorship of music, films, theater and television (a work could be censored if it was understood as subverting the political and moral values) and the censorship of the press and of other means of mass communication;
 the illegality of political meetings not authorized by the police;
 the suspension of habeas corpus for crimes of political motivation.
 the assumption by the President of the Republic of the power of sacking summarily any public servant, including elected political officers and judges, if they were found to be subversive or un-cooperative with the regime. This power was widely used to vacate the seats of Opposition members in the Legislative branch, so that elections would be held as usual, but the composition of the Legislature resulting from the elections would be dramatically changed by the deprivation of office of Opposition legislators, effectively transforming the Federal, State and even municipal legislatures in rubber-stamp bodies. The deprivation of office of Opposition legislators also affected the makeup of the Electoral College of the President of the Republic (under the 1967 and 1969 Constitutions, adopted under the military regime, the President was chosen by an Electoral College made up of the entire National Congress, and of delegates chosen by the State Assemblies). Thus, not only elections for the Executive Branch were indirect, but the vacancies created in the composition of the Legislative bodies affected the makeup of the Electoral College, so that it also became a rubber-stamp body of the military regime.
  By passing AI-5 the dictatorship could take away anyone's political rights for up to ten years, and put the death penalty back into effect
 the instant legitimacy of certain types of decrees issued by the President, that were made not liable to judicial review. Under those provisions, the Institutional Acts themselves, and any action based on an Institutional Act (such as a decree suspending political rights or removing someone from office), were not subject to judicial review.

Rebel ARENA 
The AI-5 did not silence a group of Senators from ARENA, the political party created to give support for the dictatorship. Under the leadership of Daniel Krieger, the following Senators signed a disagreement message addressed to the president: Gilberto Marinho, Miltom Campos, Carvalho Pinto, Eurico Resende, Manoel Villaça, Wilson Gonçalves, Aloisio de Carvalho Filho, Antonio Carlos Konder Reis, Ney Braga, Mem de Sá, Rui Palmeira, Teotônio Vilela, José Cândido Ferraz, Leandro Maciel, Vitorino Freire, Arnon de Melo, Clodomir Milet, José Guiomard, Valdemar Alcântara and Júlio Leite. And this unclassified document gives more background into how the ARENA political party was discriminated by the dictatorship and the AI-5 decree.

The end of AI-5 

In October 13, 1978, President Ernesto Geisel allowed Congress to pass a constitutional amendment putting an end to AI-5 and restoring habeas corpus, as part of his policy of distensão (détente) and abertura política (political opening). The constitutional amendment came into force on January 1, 1979.

In 2004, the celebrated television documentary titled AI-5 – O Dia Que Não Existiu (AI-5 – The Day That Never Existed), was released. The documentary analyzes the events prior to the decree and its consequences.

Gallery
Pages of the Institutional Act Number Five. National Archives of Brazil

References

External links
 
 
 Official text of Institutional Act #5, from the Brazilian Civil House site (in Portuguese).
 Text of Institutional Act #5, from Universidade Federal do Rio de Janeiro (in Portuguese).

Modern history of Brazil
Political history of Brazil
1968 in Brazil
Constitution of Brazil
Far-right politics in Brazil
Political repression in Brazil
Censorship in Brazil
1968 documents
political and cultural purges
Military law